The de Havilland DH.60 Moth is a 1920s British two-seat touring and training aircraft that was developed into a series of aircraft by the de Havilland Aircraft Company.

Development
The DH.60 was developed from the larger DH.51 biplane. The first flight of the ADC Cirrus powered prototype DH.60 Moth (registration G-EBKT) was carried out by Geoffrey de Havilland at the  works airfield at Stag Lane on 22 February 1925. The Moth was a two-seat biplane of wooden construction, it had a plywood covered fuselage and fabric covered surfaces, a standard tailplane with a single tailplane and fin. A useful feature of the design was its folding wings which allowed owners to hangar the aircraft in much smaller spaces. The then Secretary of State for Air Sir Samuel Hoare became interested in the aircraft and the Air Ministry subsidised five flying clubs and equipped them with Moths.

The prototype was modified with a horn-balanced rudder, as used on the production aircraft, and was entered into the 1925 King's Cup Race flown by Alan Cobham. Deliveries commenced to flying schools in England. One of the early aircraft was fitted with an all-metal twin-float landing gear to become the first Moth seaplane. The original production Moths were later known as Cirrus I Moths.

Three aircraft were modified for the 1927 King's Cup Race with internal modifications and a Cirrus II engine on a lowered engine mounting. The original designation of DH.60X (for experimental) was soon changed to Cirrus II Moth; the DH.60X designation was re-used in 1928 for the Cirrus III powered version with a split axle. The production run for the DH.60X Moth was short as it was replaced by later variants, but it was still available to special order.

Gipsy engine
Although the Cirrus engine was reliable, its manufacture was not. It depended on components salvaged from World War I–era 8-cylinder Renault engines and therefore its numbers were limited by the stockpiles of surplus Renaults. de Havilland therefore decided to replace the Cirrus with a new engine designed by Frank Halford built by his own factory. In 1928 when the new de Havilland Gipsy I engine was available a company DH.60 Moth G-EBQH was re-engined as the prototype of the DH.60G Gipsy Moth.

Next to the increase in power, the main advantage of this update was that the Gipsy was a completely new engine available in as great a number as the manufacture of Moths necessitated.  The new Gipsy engines could simply be built in-house on a production-line side by side with the Moth airframes. This also enabled de Havilland to control the complete process of building a Moth airframe, engine and all, streamline productivity and in the end lower manufacturing costs. While the original DH.60 was offered for a relatively modest £650, by 1930 the price of a new Gipsy-powered Moth was still £650, this in spite of its state-of-the-art engine.

A metal-fuselage version of the Gipsy Moth was designated the DH.60M Moth and was originally developed for overseas customers, particularly Canada. The DH.60M was also licence-built in Australia, Canada, the United States and Norway. Also in 1931 a variant of the DH.60M was marketed for military training as the DH.60T Moth Trainer.

In 1931 with the upgrade of the Gipsy engine as the Gipsy II, de Havilland inverted the engine and re-designated it the Gipsy III. The engine was fitted into a Moth aircraft, which was re-designated the DH.60G-III Moth Major. This sub-type was intended for the military trainer market and some of the first aircraft were supplied to the Swedish Air Force.

The DH.60T Moth was re-engined with the Gipsy III and was initially re-designated the DH.60T Tiger Moth. The DH.60T Tiger Moth was further modified with swept back mainplanes and the cabane struts were moved forward to improve egress from the front cockpit in case of emergency. The changes were great enough that the aircraft was again re-designated, becoming the DH.82 Tiger Moth.

Design 

Apart from the engine, the new Gipsy Moth was still a standard DH.60. Except for changes to accommodate the engine the fuselage remained the same as before, the exhaust still ran alongside the left side of the cockpits and the logo on the right side still read 'De Havilland Moth'. The fuel tank was still housed in the bulging airfoil that formed the centre section of the upper wing. The wings could still be folded alongside the fuselage and still had de Havilland's patented differential ailerons on the bottom mainplanes and no ailerons on the top ones. Colour options still remained as simple as before: wings and tail in "Moth silver", fuselage in the colour the buyer chose.

Operational history

As there was no real comparison between the original DH.60 and the new DH.60G, the Gipsy Moth quickly became the mainstay of British flying clubs as the only real recreational aircraft in the UK. By 1929 it was estimated that of every 100 aeroplanes in Britain, 85 were Moths of one type or another, most of them Gipsy Moths. This was in spite of the fact that with de Havilland having switched from the Cirrus engine to its own Gipsy engine, surplus Cirruses were now pouring into the market and a trove of Cirrus-powered aircraft like the Avro Avian, the Klemm Swallow, and the Miles Hawk started fighting for the flying club and private market.

Although replaced in production by the DH.82 Tiger Moth, the Gipsy Moth remained the mainstay of the British flying scene up to the start of WWII. The war however marked the end of the Gipsy Moth and post-war it was quickly replaced by ex-RAF Tiger Moths pouring into the civilian market.

DH.60 Moth in flying clubs
The DH.60 arrived at the right spot at the right time. Next to the Moth's maiden flight, 1925 also marked the birth of the first five Royal Aero Club flying schools and clubs and with its simplicity and performance, the Moth was the aircraft of choice to equip the clubs. De Havilland then used this income to concentrate on developing the Moth further into a mass-produced, mass-market aircraft. The Moth made the aero clubs at least just as much as the aero clubs made the Moth. The Moth remained the mainstay of the clubs even long after more modern aircraft became available.

With de Havilland's habit of painting the wings and tailplane of the Moth in silver also came the clubs' habit of distinguishing their aircraft by painting their fuselage in one distinctive club colour. Aircraft of the London Aero Club had a yellow fuselage (plus yellow struts and wheel caps); those of Newcastle a red one. Green stood for the Midlands and blue for Lancashire. Registration letters were black on the wings and, depending on the club colour, either black or white on the fuselage.

As the Royal Aero Club marketed the idea of flying clubs to other members of the Commonwealth, the de Havilland Aircraft Company followed suit and soon established subsidiaries in Australia and Canada to stock the local flying clubs there with Gipsy Moths. Canadian Moths were offered with a detachable canopy for winter flying. Other factories to licence-build the Gipsy Moth were the Larkin Aircraft Supply Company in Australia (which built 32 for the RAAF). Although built for flying clubs rather than for individual air cruising, the Australian Moths were the DH.60 L "Luxury" version and were delivered with their fuselages sporting the L's characteristic two-tone colour scheme rather than the fuselage entirely painted in the club colour as was customary in British flying clubs. Other manufacturers were Morane-Saulnier in France (40 built) and a company called Moth Aircraft Co. in the U.S. (18 built).

DH.60 Moth in private use

Most Gipsy Moths belonged to flying clubs, but after the Prince of Wales purchased a Gipsy Moth (G-AALG) for his own private flying, the aircraft became popular with high society. In addition the Moth was used for many record flights. The 'Lonely Flyer' Sir Francis Chichester flew his Gipsy Moth from England to Australia, on to New Zealand and then across the Pacific to Japan. Although he originally planned to fly around the world, a crash in Japan convinced him to switch to sailing. (Chichester subsequently named his yachts 'Gipsy Moth II', 'Gipsy Moth III', and most famously, 'Gipsy Moth IV'.)

Of the aviatrixes, London secretary Amy Johnson flew her Gipsy Moth (G-AAAH "Jason") 11,000 mi (17,703 km) to Australia in 1930, and Jean Batten used a Gipsy Moth for her flights from England to India and England to Australia (the aircraft used to fly to India was G-AALG borrowed from Victor Dorée, who then owned the plane. In March 1928 Mary Bailey flew her Cirrus Moth solo from Croydon to Cape Town, a trip of three weeks, and returned the following year.

DH.60 Moth in military service
Although the DH.60T was aggressively marketed as a military trainer, response was rather lukewarm. In particular the RAF initially purchased only a handful of aircraft for testing and found that many aspects of the Moth did not suit their method of military flight training. However, by 1931 the RAF had acquired 124 DH.60M Moths and these were used by the Central Flying School and other training units until 1939.

Moth trainers were however ordered by a number of foreign air forces including those of Argentina, Australia (as noted above), Austria, Norway, Portugal, Sweden and the flying arm of the Danish Navy. Finland licence-built 22 Moth trainers, but equipped them with the old Cirrus engine.

Two Gipsy Moths were purchased by the Paraguayan government during the Chaco War. They were used as liaison aircraft. One was lost in a fatal accident at Ñu-Guazú Air Force Base and the other survived the war. It was transferred to the Paraguayan Aeroclub in 1936.

The bulk of military Moths however were civilian sport aircraft impressed by their countries air forces and used as trainers and liaison aircraft. Like this, civilian Moths ended up flying for both the Nationalist and Republican air forces during the Spanish Civil War. This was repeated on a larger scale during the Second World War where Moths ended up flying, amongst others, for the air forces of Egypt, China (with several captured ex-Chinese aircraft flying for the Japanese), Ireland, Italy, Iraq, Belgian Congo, Dutch East Indies (later taken over by the Indonesian AF), South Africa, New Zealand and the U.S. Navy.

Variants
(Variants are listed in chronological order)

DH.60 Cirrus Moth
Prototype and early production aircraft powered by a  ADC Cirrus engine. 8 pre-production and 31 production aircraft built.
DH.60 Cirrus II Moth (also known as the Hermes Moth)
Introduced in 1927 this variant had a slightly larger wingspan and decreased distance between the upper and lower wings. Powered by an uprated (105 hp/78 kW) Cirrus Hermes engine, 32 built.
DH.60 Genet Moth
A small number of DH.60 Moths were fitted with the Armstrong Siddeley Genet radial engine. The type was used by the Royal Air Force Central Flying School for display purposes, six built.
DH.60G Gipsy Moth

First major overhaul of the design: Cirrus engine replaced by a 100 hp (75 kW) de Havilland Gipsy I engine.
DH.60GII (GipsyII Moth)
Powered by a  Gipsy II. Commonly referred to as a "Gipsy Moth" just like the  version.
DH.60X
Optional 'X' braced undercarriage version of the early Gipsy Moth. (X-style undercarriage became standard for the DH.60M and all subsequent models)
DH.60L (Luxury)
Offered with wider let-down cockpit doors and an enlarged luggage locker behind the rear cockpit. The luxury version also featured a state-of-the-art 1930s-style two-colour paint scheme for the fuselage.
DH.60M Moth (Metal Moth)
The original plywood box fuselage replaced with a construction of metal stringers covered with doped fabric. Although overall weight increased, maintenance became easier and metal fuselages became standard for all later versions. Four pre-production aircraft, 536 built by de Havilland at Stag Lane, 40 built by de Havilland Canada, 161 built by the Moth Corporation in the United States, 10 built by the Norwegian Army Aircraft Factory in Norway.
DH.60T (Moth Trainer)
Trainer variant of the Metal-Gipsy Moth. Rearranging of the inner wing bracing wires allowed for easier access to the front cockpit, a necessity for military pilots wearing parachutes. Two prototypes and 47 production aircraft were built.
(Production for all Gipsy I and II variants: 595 built by de Havilland at Stag Lane Aerodrome, 40 built by Morane-Saulnier in France, 18 built by the Moth Corporation in the United States, and 32 built by Larkin Aircraft Supply in Australia.)

DH.60G III  Moth
In 1931 the company took a de Havilland Gipsy II engine and turned it upside down and re-designated it the Gipsy III, this engine was then fitted to the Moth to create the DG.60G III Moth, 57 built including 10 as fuselages for the Royal Air Force as 'Queen Bee' target drones.

DH.60G III Moth Major
In 1934 from the 58th DH.60G III onwards, the engine name was changed to Gipsy Major and the resulting variant was renamed the DH.60G III Moth Major. 96 were built including 10 as fuselages for the Royal Air Force as 'Queen Bee' target drones, production ending in May 1935. A final Moth Major was built by the de Havilland Technical School, giving total production of the DH.60G III of 154.

DH.60T (Tiger Moth Prototypes)
Eight prototypes with swept wings for a proposed RAF trainer. Because of the substantial changes, the aircraft entered production as the DH.82 Tiger Moth.
Note: Variant information taken from Bransom.

Operators

Military operators

Royal Australian Air Force

Austrian Air Force (1927–1938)

Belgium Air Force – Postwar, one aircraft.

Force Publique
Burma
Burma Volunteer Air Force – One aircraft only.

Brazilian Air Force
Brazilian Army
Brazilian Naval Aviation

Royal Canadian Air Force

Chinese Nationalist Air Force

Chilean Air Force

Cuban Navy

Danish Army Flying Corps
Danish Naval Air Service

Royal Egyptian Air Force

Imperial Ethiopian Air Force

Finnish Air Force

Luftwaffe (small numbers)

Hellenic Air Force

Hungarian Air Force

Irish Air Corps

Iraqi Air Force
 (captured from China)

Norwegian Army Air Service

New Zealand Permanent Air Force
Royal New Zealand Air Force
No. 4 Squadron RNZAF

Paraguayan Air Arm
Transport Squadron during the Chaco War

Polish Air Force

Portuguese Navy

Royal Romanian Air Force

South African Air Force

Spanish Republican Air Force

Spanish Air Force

Swedish Air Force

Royal Air Force
Central Flying School
Royal Air Force College
No.5 Flying Training School
No. 24 Squadron RAF
No. 173 Squadron RAF
No. 510 Squadron RAF
Royal Navy Fleet Air Arm

United States Navy – One DH.60 purchased for use by the US Naval attaché in London.

Royal Yugoslav Air Force
Yugoslav Royal Navy

Surviving aircraft

There are currently 31 de Havilland DH.60 Moths on the UK aircraft register (as of August 2017).
There are currently six DH.60 Moths on the Australian aircraft register (as of 15 November 2015).
There is one DH.60M at Kjeller Aerodrome outside Oslo, Norway. Built by de Havilland in March 1929, it was shipped to Australia, registered as VH-UKC and won the air race between Sydney and Perth that same year. Crashed in May 1930 and subsequently stored. Remains bought by Kjeller Flyhistoriske Forening in Norway in 2007, and rebuilt to as new standard over a ten-year period. Airworthy, with new registration LN-KFM.
The oldest surviving DH.60 Moth (G-EBLV built in 1925), remains airworthy as of August 2017, and is owned and operated by the BAe Systems Heritage Flight in the UK. It is kept at the Shuttleworth Collection, Old Warden Aerodrome and is often displayed at airshows.
A 1928 DH.60X Moth (G-EBWD) has been based at a single aerodrome (Old Warden) for longer than any other aeroplane in aviation history. This Moth was originally Richard Shuttleworth's own private aircraft in which he learnt to fly and during its career was extensively modified with an original Cirrus Hermes engine but an X-legged undercarriage and different windshields on the front and rear cockpit. It remains airworthy as of August 2017 and is displayed at British airshows during the summer months.
VH-UAE is the world's second oldest DH.60 still airworthy (serial number 192, constructed in 1925) and was first registered in Australia as VH-UAE on 5 November 1925 making it the longest registered, airworthy aircraft in Australia. It was impressed into RAAF for training service during WW2 (A7-88), and disposed of in 1945. The original 'VH' registration was re-issued. Other than a brief restoration time during 2000, the aircraft has been airworthy and registered since 1925.

Aircraft on display
The following DH.60 Moth aircraft are on public display in museums:
DH.60G Gipsy Moth, G-AAAH, Jason used by Amy Johnson is on static display at the London Science Museum.
DH.60G Gipsy Moth, formerly CC-FNG, now marked as 'LAN 32' at Museo Nacional Aeronáutico y del Espacio de Chile, Chile.
DH 60G Gipsy Moth, formerly VH-ULJ, on static display at The South Australian Aviation Museum, Port Adelaide, South Australia.
DH60G Gipsy Moth, OH-VKM on static display at Malmö Museums, Sweden.
DH60X Cirrus Moth, OH-EJA, ”Jurre”, on static display at Finnish Air Force Museum, Finland

Specifications (DH.60G Gipsy Moth)

See also

References

Notes

Bibliography
 Bransom, Alan. The Tiger Moth Story, Fourth Edition. Shrewsbury, UK: Airlife Publishing Ltd., 1991. .

External links

Amy Johnson exhibit at Science Museum (archived)
DH.60 Gipsy Moth displayed at the Royal Air Force Museum (archived) 
DH.60X Cirrus Moth, G-EBWD at the Shuttleworth Collection
The de Havilland Moth Club
Details of Chilean preserved DH.60G at Chile's Aviation Museum (archived) 
DH.60G aircraft  on the UK aircraft register

1920s British civil utility aircraft
1920s British sport aircraft
DH.060 Moth
Single-engined tractor aircraft
Biplanes
Aircraft first flown in 1925